Punch Me is a 2011 short film drama about a young man who must embrace his identity or risk losing the two people he loves most. The film examines important messages regarding self, parental and societal acceptance as well as love and health awareness. The film played in several film festivals from 2010-2012, winning and being nominated for multiple awards and/or accolades.

Cast 
 Robert X. Golphin as Son
 Brian Anthony Wilson as Father
 Elwood Idris Simon as Boyfriend

Awards

Festival releases

References 

  Greater Philadelphia Film Office Events Calendar Profiles Sneak Preview of Punch Me
 Philadelphia Daily News Article About Punch Me 
 Reelblack Article About Punch Me Screening
 Rags N' Riches Magazine Article About Punch Me star Elwood Idris Simon.
 Falcon Forum Article About St. Aug's Alum & Punch Me star Robert X. Golphin.
 City's Best Article Featuring Punch Me
 Lincolnian Article About Punch Me star Elwood Idris Simon
 Philadelphia Daily News Article About "Punch Me"
 Black Voice News Article Features "Punch Me"
 NCIndieSeen Interview With "Punch Me" Star Robert X. Golphin
 NCIndieSeen Feature On "Punch Me"
 Bebashi: Transition To Hope Newsletter Features "Punch Me" Screening
 "Punch Me" As Part of the Riverside Int'l Film Fest Lineup
 "Punch Me" As Part of the NC Black Film Festival Lineup
 "Punch Me" As Part of the Edgemar Short Film Festival Lineup
 "Punch Me" As Part of the Love Unlimited Film Festival & Art Exhibition Lineup & Awards
 "Punch Me" As Part of the Black Maria Film + Video Festival & Awards Lineup
 "Punch Me" Featured In The HBCU Digest
 Atlantic City CineFest List of Nominations for 2011 Festival
 Philadelphia Tribune Feature Story About "Punch Me"
 "Punch Me" As Part of the Nashville Black Pride Festival Lineup in Out & About Newspaper
 Winners List of the 2012 Los Angeles Movie Awards & Awards Website

External links 
 

2011 films
2011 short films
American short films
2011 drama films
2010s English-language films